Diamond Plaza is a luxurious shopping center in downtown District 1, Ho Chi Minh City. The complex includes a 22-story building and a 15-story building which serves as shopping center, 6 cinema lounges, restaurants, café and hospital. The complex was completed and open for business in 1999. There is a helicopter pad on the roof of the building. By this building is located Saigon Notre-Dame Basilica and Saigon Central Post Office. South Korea's Posco Construction & Engineering did the construction for the building.

References

External links
 Official website of Diamond Plaza
  Diamond Plaza on website of Emporis

Shopping malls in Ho Chi Minh City